Calliotropis ostrideslithos is a species of sea snail, a marine gastropod mollusk in the family Eucyclidae.

Description
The size of the shell varies between 3 mm and 6 mm.

Distribution
Calliotropis ostrideslithos can be found in the waters surrounding Fiji. and the Solomon Islands.

References

 Vilvens C. (2007) New records and new species of Calliotropis from Indo-Pacific. Novapex 8 (Hors Série 5): 1–72

External links
 

ostrideslithos
Gastropods described in 2007